Arthez-de-Béarn (literally Arthez of Béarn) is a commune in the Pyrénées-Atlantiques department in southwestern France.

It took its name from the county of Artois (Artés in Occitan, adapted in French as Arthès or Arthez) like three other communes of France (Arthez-d'Asson, Arthez-d'Armagnac, and Arthès).

In 1950, -de-Béarn was added to its name to differentiate it from the other Arthès.

International relations
The commune is twinned with:
 Bogen, Bavaria, Germany
 Biescas, Aragon, Spain
 Olite, Navarre, Spain

See also
Communes of the Pyrénées-Atlantiques department

References

Communes of Pyrénées-Atlantiques